The 55th Filmfare Awards were held on 27 February 2010 at the Yash Raj Studios in Mumbai, India. The awards given for 30 categories, out of which there were 3 special awards, 3 critics awards and 24 main awards for Hindi films released in 2009. There were 60 nominations for the top 10 categories, which were based on votes via web and newspaper forms. The award ceremony was hosted by Shahrukh Khan and Saif Ali Khan.

Love Aaj Kal led the ceremony with 12 nominations, followed by 3 Idiots with 11 nominations and Kaminey with 10 nominations.

3 Idiots and Dev.D won 6 awards each, thus becoming the most-awarded films at the ceremony, with the former winning  Best Film, Best Director (for Rajkumar Hirani) and Best Supporting Actor (for Boman Irani), and the latter winning Best Actress (Critics) (for Mahie Gill) and Best Supporting Actress (for Kalki Koechlin).

Paa fetched Amitabh Bachchan his 5th Best Actor award, and Vidya Balan her first ever Best Actress award, for their performance as the son-mother duo of Auro and Vidya.

Kareena Kapoor received dual nominations for Best Actress for her performances in 3 Idiots and Kurbaan, but lost to Vidya Balan who won the award for Paa.

Awards and nominees

Main Awards

Critics' awards

Technical Awards

Special awards

See also

 Bollywood

References

External links
Filmfare awards

Filmfare Awards
Filmfare